Dibenzopentalene (dibenzo[a,e]pentalene or dibenzo[b,f]pentalene) is an organic compound and a hydrocarbon with formula C16H10. It is of some scientific interest as a stable derivative of the highly reactive antiaromatic pentalene by benzannulation. The first derivative was synthesised in 1912 by Brand. The parent compound was reported in 1952. The NICS value for the 5-membered rings is estimated at  7.4 ppm and that of the six-membered rings -9.8 ppm. Aromatic dicationic salts can be obtained by reaction with antimony pentafluoride in sulfuryl chloride. The dianion forms by reduction with lithium metal or deprotonation of 5,10-dihydroindeno[2,1-a]indene with two equivalents of butyllithium. The aromatic nature of the dianion has been confirmed by X-ray analysis. Another isomer of this compound exists called dibenzo[a,f]pentalene with one of the benzene rings positioned on the other available pentalene face.

References

Antiaromatic compounds
Polycyclic nonaromatic hydrocarbons